July Talk is the debut full-length album by Canadian indie rock band July Talk. Originally released in 2012 on Sleepless Records, the album won the Juno Award for Alternative Album of the Year at the Juno Awards of 2015 after the release of an expanded edition in 2013.

For Your Bloodshot Eyes
The album's American release included three songs not on either the original or expanded Canadian editions of the album. These songs, "Gentleman", "Blood + Honey" and "Uninvited", were released in Canada as the separate EP For Your Bloodshot Eyes in 2014.

Track listing
† denotes tracks that were added to the expanded 2013 edition.

 "Garden"
 "Guns + Ammunition"
 "Paper Girl"
 "Brother"
 "Someone"
 "Having You Around"
 "Headsick" †
 "Summer Dress" †
 "My Neck" †
 "Let Her Know"
 "Don't Call Home"
 "Black Lace" †
 "Come Down Champion"
 "I've Rationed Well"

Certifications

References 

2012 debut albums
July Talk albums
Juno Award for Alternative Album of the Year albums